Brian H. Stubbs (born 8 February 1950) is a former footballer who played as a defender.

Initially a student at Loughborough University, Stubbs signed for Notts County in September 1968 and spent the whole of his professional career at the club. He played for the club in the Football League Fourth Division but by the time he left had helped them into the top flight.

References

1950 births
Living people
English footballers
Notts County F.C. players
English Football League players
Alumni of Loughborough University
People from Keyworth
Footballers from Nottinghamshire
Association football defenders